Charles Appleton may refer to:

 Charles Appleton (academic) (1841–1879), Oxford don and scholarly entrepreneur
 Charles Appleton (cricketer) (1844–1925), English amateur cricketer
 Charles William Appleton (1874–1945), vice president of the General Electric Company, judge and Assistant District Attorney in New York City